Mayor Luis Jorge Fontana is a southern department of Chaco Province in Argentina.

The provincial subdivision has a population of about 53,500 inhabitants in an area of  3,708 km², and its capital city is Villa Ángela, which is located around 182 km from the provincial capital.  The department takes its name from Luis Jorge Fontana, the first governor of Chubut and an explorer of the region.

Settlements
Coronel Du Graty
Enrique Urién
Villa Ángela

References

1910 establishments in Argentina
Departments of Chaco Province